Edward Brueton (1871 – after 1893) was an English footballer born in Penn, Staffordshire, who played in the Football League as a goalkeeper for Small Heath.

Playing career
He joined Small Heath from Stafford Rangers on trial in September 1894. Without even playing reserve team football, he stood in for regular goalkeeper Charles Partridge in the home game against Preston North End on 29 September, conceded four goals – the game finished as a 4–4 draw – and was back in non-league football with Willenhall Swifts by November.

References

1871 births
Year of death missing
Footballers from Wolverhampton
English footballers
Association football goalkeepers
Stafford Rangers F.C. players
Birmingham City F.C. players
English Football League players
Date of birth missing
Willenhall F.C. players